The Puente de Trujillo Alto is a Pennsylvania through truss bridge built during 1939–1941 in Puerto Rico in the Trujillo Alto municipality of Puerto Rico. At was the longest single-span bridge in Puerto Rico.

The bridge construction was funded as part of the New Deal. The supporting structures and bridge were built by Robert Prann, an engineer who established private practice in Puerto Rico, with steel components manufactured by U.S. Steel.

The height was intended to keep this bridge above flooding that had destroyed a previous bridge in 1936. However, in 1945 even this bridge was flooded over and almost carried away.

A four-lane concrete bridge was built adjacently during 1983-85 as a replacement, with the historic bridge being slated for demolition, but local protests led to its being kept.

Gallery

References

Road bridges on the National Register of Historic Places in Puerto Rico
Bridges completed in 1941
Steel bridges
1941 establishments in Puerto Rico
Trujillo Alto, Puerto Rico
Pennsylvania truss bridges
New Deal in Puerto Rico